Hörbuchbestenliste is a literary prize of Germany.

Hörbücher des Jahres – Audiobooks of the Year 
 1997: Zeugnis ablegen. Die Tagebücher des Victor Klemperer 1933–1945. ca. 5 h 30 min., Der Audio Verlag, Berlin/DeutschlandRadio
 1998: Bertolt Brecht: Werke – Eine Auswahl. ca. 18 Std., BMG/ARIS
 1999: Michail Bulgakow: Der Meister und Margarita. ca. 12 h 30 min., Der Hörverlag/mdr
 2000: Hans Magnus Enzensberger: Das Wasserzeichen der Poesie. ca. 140 min., Eichborn Verlag/hr2
 2001: The Spoken Arts Treasury. ca. 890 Min., Der Hörverlag
 2002: Vladimir Nabokov: Pnin. ca. 420 Min., Der Audio Verlag/SFB
 2003: Kinski spricht Werke der Weltliteratur. Sprecher: Klaus Kinski. 20 CDs, Deutsche Grammophon/Klaus Kinski Productions
 2004: Gottfried Benn: Das Hörwerk 1928–1956. ca. 11 h, Zweitausendeins/BR, DLR, DRS, hr, NDR, radiobremen, rbb, SWR, WDR
 2005: Rolf Dieter Brinkmann: Wörter Sex Schnitt. 5 CDs, Intermedium Records/BR
 2006: Ror Wolf: Gesammelte Fußballhörspiele. 4 CDs, Intermedium Records/Strunz!, BR, SWR, hr2, WDR
 2007: Peter Weiss: Die Ästhetik des Widerstands. 12 CDs, Der Hörverlag/BR, WDR
 2008: Peter Kurzeck: Ein Sommer, der bleibt – Peter Kurzeck erzählt das Dorf seiner Kindheit. 4 CDs, Verlag supposé
 2009: Christiane Collorio, Peter Hamm, Harald Hartung, Michael Krüger (Hrsg.): Lyrikstimmen – Die Bibliothek der Poeten. 9 CDs, Der Hörverlag
 2010: Marcel Proust: Auf der Suche nach der verlorenen Zeit (Gesamtausgabe). Sprecher: Peter Matić. 17 MP3-CDs. ca. 156 Std. Der Hörverlag
 2011: Josef Bierbichler: Mittelreich. Sprecher: Josef Bierbichler. 10 CDs. 12 h 7 min. DAV/Bayern2.
 2012: James Joyce: Ulysses. Hörverlag/SWR, DLF, Regie: Klaus Buhlert, Dramaturgie: Manfred Hess, 23 CDs
 2013: Paul Plamper: Der Kauf. WDR/BR/DLF/Schauspiel, Köln, 1 CD (68 min.), 
 2014: Dieter Wellershoff: Ans Ende kommen – Dieter Wellershoff erzählt über Altern und Sterben. supposé, 1 CD (66 min.), 
 2015: Ulrike Janssen, Norbert Wehr (Hrsg.): Thomas Kling – Die gebrannte Performance. Schriftenreihe der Kunststiftung NRW im Lilienfeld Verlag, 4 CDs (4 h 20 min.), 
 2016: John Dos Passos: Manhattan Transfer. SWR2/DLF, Hörbuch Hamburg
 2017: Friederike Mayröcker (Text) und Lesch Schmidt (Musik): Requiem für Ernst Jandl.(requiem for Ernst Jandl) speak low
 2018: Wolfgang Herrndorf: Bilder deiner großen Liebe, 1 CD (1 h 11 min.)
 2019: Annie Ernaux: Die Jahre (The Years), DAV/hr2-kultur, 1 CD.
 2020: Thomas Pynchon: Die Enden der Parabel, SWR2, 13 CDs.

Audiobooks for Children and Youth 
 1998: A. A. Milne: Pu der Bär – Teil 1 bis 6. ca. 380 Min., Kein&Aber Records
 1999: Marjaleena Lembcke: Als die Steine noch Vögel waren. ca. 100 Min., Uccello Verlag
 2000: J. K. Rowling: Harry Potter, 3 volumes Der Hörverlag
 2001: Frantz Wittkamp: Du bist da, und ich bin hier. ca. 37 Min., Hörcompany
 2002: Mirjam Pressler: Malka Mai. ca. 210 Min., Der Hörverlag
 2003: Paul Maar: Lippels Traum. 4 CDs, Deutsche Grammophon
 2004: Kate DiCamillo: Despereaux. Von einem der auszog das Fürchten zu verlernen. 3 CDs, Hörcompany
 2005: Kate DiCamillo: Winn-Dixie. 2 CDs, Hörcompany
 2006: Dolf Verroen: Wie schön weiß ich bin. 1 CD, Hörcompany
 2007: Guus Kuijer: Das Buch von allen Dingen. 2 CDs, Oetinger Audio
 2008: Andreas Steinhöfel: Rico, Oskar und die Tieferschatten. Sprecher: Andreas Steinhöfel. 4 CDs, Hörbuch Hamburg/Silberfisch
 2009: Marie-Aude Murail: Simpel. Sprecher: Martin Baltscheit. 4 CDs, Hörcompany
 2010: Bibi Dumon Tak: Kuckuck, Krake, Kakerlake: das etwas andere Tierhörbuch. Sprecher: Andreas Fröhlich, Leslie Malton, Felix von Manteuffel, Patrick Bach, Oliver Rohrbeck, Anne Helm u. a., 1 CD, Oetinger Media
 2011: Salah Naoura: Matti und Sami und die drei größten Fehler des Universums Sprecher: Martin Baltscheit. 2 CDs (ca. 140 Min.), Hörcompany
 2012: John Green: Das Schicksal ist ein mieser Verräter. wefwe, 5 CDs, Hörbuch Hamburg, Silberfisch
 2013: Annette Pehnt: Der Bärbeiß. Hörbuch Hamburg, Silberfisch, gesprochen von Katharina Thalbach, 1 CD (87 Min.), 
 2014: Martin Baltscheit: Nur 1 Tag. Oetinger audio, 1 CD (41 Min.), 
 2015: Ulf Nilsson: Kommissar Gordon – Der erste Fall. (Detective Gordon: The First Case) Headroom,  1 CD (60 Min.), 
 2016: Torben Kuhlmann: Lindbergh – Die abenteuerliche Geschichte einer fliegenden Maus. hr2-kultur, Der Hörverlag
 2017: Kai Pannen: Mach die Biege, Fliege! headroom
 2018: Martin Muser: Kannawoniwasein! Manchmal muss man einfach verduften. 2 CDs (2 Stunden 19 Minuten)
 2019: Lois Lowry: Die schreckliche Geschichte der abscheulichen Familie Willoughby. 2 CDs.
 2020: Onjali Q. Raúf: Der Junge aus der letzten Reihe,(The Boy at the Back of the Class) 4 CDs.

German literary awards